Tworóg  is a village in Tarnowskie Góry County, Silesian Voivodeship, in southern Poland. It is the seat of the gmina (administrative district) called Gmina Tworóg.

The village has a population of 3,500.

References

Villages in Tarnowskie Góry County